Simon Berger, born in 1976, is a Swiss contemporary visual artist. He is best known for pioneering the art made by breaking glass with a hammer. His work has been widely exhibited around the world.

Life
Simon Berger was born on April 9, 1976. He grew up in Herzogenbuchsee, a municipality in the Oberaargau administrative district in the canton of Bern in Switzerland. Berger got professional education as a carpenter. He currently resides and works in his own studio in Niederönz.

About Bergers Work 
Simon Berger’s glass portraits visualize a tension between strength and fragility through its motif, as well as his handling of the glass. The anonymous female portraits commonly share a powerful expression, their fierce gazes either piercing through the viewer, or fixating on an object beyond the frame. When approaching the artworks closely, these captivating images disintegrate into an amalgamation of cracks and jagged-edged shards of glass. Contrary to expectations of how glass should be handled cautiously to ensure its integrity, Berger makes use of the material’s brittleness to develop his artistic language.

Reminiscent of sculptural techniques, a hammer is used to imprint the highlighted facial features into the sheet of glass. An initially transparent support of the image, the pane of glass, becomes partially opaque. The controlled shattering of the glass creates fractures which are subject to the material’s physical laws. However, instead of collapsing into itself, the safety glass keeps the shards in place. These artworks fascinate by juxtaposing strength with fragility and expectations towards glass with Berger’s approach to the material. The incidence of light is reflected by the fragments and cracks within the glass, making the artworks surface gleam and glisten and depending on the illumination, it seems as if the portrait itself were glowing. Through destruction, Simon Berger allows beauty to emerge.

According to the magazine French magazine RTS, Berger's work was influenced by the pop art movement and Neorealism.

Simon Berger made his first works on glass in 2017, in his studio in Niederönz, Switzerland. Soon, the originality of his technique put him in the media spotlight, and he was invited by many institutions or events such as the largest street art festival in Europe, the Street Art Fest Grenoble-Alpes, where he created a live diptych. The work can be seen in Grenoble at 113 cours Berriat in a window provided by the ARaymond company. In March 2021, Simon Berger created a portrait of Kamala Harris, the Vice President of the United States, in partnership with the American National Museum of Women's History. In August 2021, he was associated with the "We are Unbreakable" project, sponsored by MTV Lebanon in tribute to the victims of the Beirut harbour explosion in 2020.

Berger's Broken Window Theory 
Contemporary glass artist Simon Berger speaks a singular plastic language by exploring the depth of his material, the glass that he pounds, or cracks with a hammer. The window becomes the support of an expansion done by impacts playing with transparency. The closer and briefer the blows, the stronger the contrasts and the shades. In his hands, the hammer is not a tool of destruction, but rather an amplifier of effects. His lacerated portraits, sculpted in glass, bring the gaze into the intricacies of transparent wounds that he calls “morphogenesis”. A pioneer of this technic, his broken pieces evoke his fascination for faces, especially women’s. With his work on window panes, the artist takes ownership of reality, and probes the expressive copabilities of inert materials destined for factories. His metallic paintings become canvases where perceptions confront with interpretations. Simon Berger began his artistic explorations with spray can before turning to other mediums. A carpenter by training, his natural attraction to wood inspired him his first creations out of the street. A lover of mechanics, he also spent plenty of time working on car carcasses. It was while pondering about what to do with a car windshield that his art was born. “Human faces have always fascinated me”, explained Simon. “On safety glass, these motifs come into their own and magically attract visitors. It is a discovery from abstract fogging to figurative perception.” A compulsive explorer of materials, he has also sculpted hyper realistic anamorphism of colored faces using the suspenders of Jeans and T-Shirts, or skulls with the remains of a washed-out ceiling… His art shakes up the interpretation of reality and his esthetics put an interesting spin on the “broken window” theory.

Selected Exhibitions 

Selected Solo Exhibitions:

Simon Berger, Agence DS, Paris, France (2022); Simon Berger, Arstübli, Basel, Switzerland (2022); Shattered, Aurum Gallery, Bangkok, Thailand (2022); Unbreakable Identities, Gallotti&Radice, Milano, Italy (2022); Le verre dans tous ses éclats, Vitromusée Romont, Switzerland (2022); Cracked Beauties, Mazel Galerie, Brussel, Belgium (2022); reFORMATION (with Pierre-Alain Münger), Frankonian Museum, Feuchtwangen, Germany (2022); Simon Berger, Artstübli Gallery, Basel, Switzerland (2021); Defekt - Duo Show with Pierre-Alain Münger, Artstübli (2019); Gallery, Basel, Switzerland (2019)Selected Group Exhibitions:

Sculpture Garden Biennal Genéve, MAMCO (Musée d’art moderne et contemporain), Geneva, Switzerland (2022); Spring Break, Mazel Galerie, Brussels, Belgium (2022); Glasstress - State of Mind, Fondazione Berengo, Murano, Venice, Italy (2022); L’ Ancien Musée de Peinture, Grenoble, France (2022); Break that wall, Mazel (2021); Galerie, Brussels, Belgium (2021); Street Art Fest, Grenoble, France (2020). 

Selected Public Installations:

L’Espoir, Street Art Fest, Grenoble, France, curated by Jerome Catz, Spacejunk Grenoble (2022); Untitled (front window), Aurum Gallery, Bangkok, Thailand, curated by Goldie and Leon Wilkinson, Aurum Gallery (2022); Serpenti, BVLGARI, Zürich, Switzerland, curated by Florian Paul Koenig, Network of Arts (2022); Broken Lives, Ministry of Traffic Safety of France, Paris, France, curated by Laurent Marthaler, Laurent Marthaler Contemporary (2022); Kamala Harris, Abraham Lincoln Memorial, United States, curated by Philipp Brogli, Artstübli; We are Unbreakable, MTV Lebanon, Beirut, Lebanon, curated by Laurent Marthaler (2021); Untitled, Golf Court Ätigkofen, Switzerland (2021); Abribus, City of Geneva (CH), curated by Jean-Damien Zacchariotto (2020); Untitled, City of Geneva, Switzerland, Promenade du Lac, curated by Jean-Damien Zacchariotto (2020); Untitled (front window), Artstübli Gallery, Basel, Switzerland (2020); E=mc2, Motorex, Langenthal, Switz (2016).

Public and Private Collections 
Museo del Vetro, Murano, Italy
Beit Beirut museum, Lebanon
National Museum of Women's History in Washington, D.C., USA, "Portrait of Kamala Harris"
Murten Museum, Switzerland
Frankonian Museum, Feuchtwangen, Germany
Vitromusée Romont, Switzerland
Jessica Goldman Collection, Miami, USA
Foundation Dr. Hanspeter & Christine Rentsch, Grenchen, Switzerland
NOA Collection, Lucerne, Switzerland

Press 
 La Republicca, February 2023, Murano, i ritratti incisi sul vetro di Simon Berger
 Newspaper of Basel, January 2023, Hämmern mit Fingerspitzengefühl: Simon Berger zeigt in Basel Werke aus Glas, Licht und Reflexionen

 Artnet News, February 2021, To Celebrate the Glass Ceiling Kamala Harris Shattered, This Artist Installed a Portrait of Her in Washington Made Entirely of Cracked Glass

 Smithsonian Magazine, April 2021, Kamala Harris Portrait Draws Inspiration From the Glass Ceiling She Shattered
 La Liberté, April 2020, Portraits en verre brisé de Simon Berger exposés à Genève

References 

1976 births
Living people
Swiss artists
Swiss contemporary artists
Pop artists